Mohammad-Ali Najafi is an Iranian politician who served as the governor of Gilan Province.

References
Profile

1956 births
Living people
Moderation and Development Party politicians
Iranian governors